"Two Hearts Collide" is a pop/romantic song released in 1988, in the studio album Staring at the Sun, by the British musical group Level 42. It was written by Mark King and Boon Gould, that had already abandoned the band. It was not well received by critics in the beginning, as almost all of the music of the album Staring at the Sun, in spite of this, was well received by the fans of the band. This song is in the compilation released in 1998 Turn It On. The lead vocals are by Mark King.

External links
Level 42 official website

Level 42 songs
1988 songs
Songs written by Mark King (musician)
Songs written by Boon Gould